This article is a list of diseases of lentils (Lens culinaris).

Fungal diseases

Nematodes, parasitic

Viral diseases

Lentil
Pulse crop diseases
Lentil